70 Aquilae, abbreviated 70 Aql, is a single orange-hued star in the equatorial constellation of Aquila. 70 Aquilae is its Flamsteed designation. It is visible to the naked eye with an apparent visual magnitude of 4.90. The star is moving closer to the Earth with a heliocentric radial velocity of −9 km/s.

Classification
Perkins et al. Houk and Swift (1999) matched an ordinary giant with a class of K3 III. Many sources still use the 1991 Bright Star Catalogue classification of K5 II, which instead suggests a bright giant star.

Size and temperature
It is radiating 4,072 times the Sun's luminosity from its enlarged photosphere at an effective temperature of 3,900 K.

References

K-type giants
Aquila (constellation)
Durchmusterung objects
Aquilae, 70
196321
101692
7873